James Clay Hageman (March 2, 1930 – August 23, 2006) was an American politician, businessman, and rancher who served as a member of the Wyoming House of Representatives from 1983 until his death in 2006.

Early life and education 
Hageman was born in Douglas, Wyoming and graduated from Douglas High School in 1948. He attended the University of Wyoming for two years.

Career 
Hageman served in the United States Army, where he was stationed in Germany. After returning to Wyoming, Hageman founded a ranch in Fort Laramie, Wyoming. He served as a member of the Wyoming House of Representatives from his election in 1982 until his death in 2006. During his tenure, Hageman served as chair of the House Education Committee for 12 years.

Personal life 
Hageman married Marion Malvin on May 19, 1956. They had six children. His daughter, Harriet Hageman, is an attorney and politician who was elected in 2022 to serve as the U.S. representative for Wyoming's at-large congressional district.

References 

1930 births
2006 deaths
People from Douglas, Wyoming
People from Converse County, Wyoming
Republican Party members of the Wyoming House of Representatives
People from Goshen County, Wyoming